Viiv may refer to:

 Intel Viiv (stylized as: V//V) computing platform
 ViiV Healthcare, UK pharmaceutical company
 1989 Tiananmen Square protests and massacre (June 4th), expressed as VIIV (6-4 in Roman numerals) as an alternate name

See also

 VIV (disambiguation)
 Vivi (disambiguation)